Cherie Mary Lunghi (born 4 April 1952) is an English film, television, and theatre actress, known for her roles in many British TV dramas. Her international fame stems from her role as Guinevere in the 1981 film Excalibur. Her long list of screen, stage, and TV credits include football manager Gabriella Benson in the 1990s television series The Manageress and a series of advertisements for Kenco coffee. She also competed in the 2008 series of Strictly Come Dancing. She is the mother of the actress Nathalie Lunghi.

Early life
Lunghi was born in Nottingham. Her father, Alessandro Lunghi, was Italian.

She was raised by her mother, aunt and grandmother, seeing her father only occasionally. Lunghi has described herself as feeling "different" as she did not have a mother and father like other children. Lunghi attended Richmond Grammar School in North Yorkshire but has said that she was not academic and far more interested in make believe.

Career
Educated at London's Arts Educational School, Lunghi played Hedvig in The Wild Duck and Alice in Alice in Wonderland on BBC radio while still at school. After graduating from Homerton College, Cambridge and London's Central School of Speech and Drama, she joined the Royal Shakespeare Company in the late 1970s, taking leading roles such as Perdita, Celia, and Viola. She had a starring role in the 1979 British short film Diversion   (the prototype for the 1987 U.S. film Fatal Attraction). In 1981 she landed the role of Guinevere in the film Excalibur.

She starred in the 1982 television serial Praying Mantis, based on the book (Les Mantes Religieuses) by Hubert Monteilhet. The thriller co-starred Pinkas Braun, Carmen du Sautoy, and Jonathan Pryce. 
In 1985 Lunghi played Michal in King David alongside Edward Woodward and Richard Gere.
She also appeared alongside Robert De Niro in The Mission. Lunghi told author Paul Stenning, "It was wonderful working with him, it was extraordinary actually. He transforms right in front of you. You are aware when watching him on screen that he has transformed – he is not Robert De Niro – he is somebody else. I don't think you can learn how to do that; it's just the power of your imagination." 

In the mid-1980s, she relocated to Los Angeles for eight years, but returned to England to care for her mother. After the birth of her daughter she took various short-term parts, including playing the band members' mutual love interest in the music video for Level 42's song "Something About You". Lunghi has described how she had been working during pregnancy and was working again three months after giving birth, saying, "it was working mother guilt. I was juggling and balancing, trying to be fair to my career and to my child. Nathalie would come everywhere with me." 

Lunghi took on the lead role in football drama The Manageress (1989–90), and participated in the BBC adaptation of Edith Wharton's posthumously published novel, The Buccaneers (1995), as Laura Testvalley. In addition to film and television work, she appeared in a long-running advertising campaign on British television for Kenco coffee from the late 1990s onwards.

In 2006, Lunghi appeared on television in Casualty 1906, playing Matron Eva Luckes, and had a recurring guest role in the regular Casualty series as Professor Camille Windsor. In 2013, she narrated some episodes of the BBC genealogy series Who Do You Think You Are?.

Strictly Come Dancing
In 2008, she competed in the sixth series of BBC television's Strictly Come Dancing (14-week run), partnered by James Jordan. After her first dance, the Foxtrot on the Ladies Night in week two, she scored the highest points of the first two weeks (33). She beat this score with another series-best score of 35/40 for the rumba to finish week four atop the remaining 12 contestants with an average score of 34/40. The score for her third dance, the American Smooth, was an impressive 34 to maintain her average, though she slipped to 31/40 for the Paso Doble, and further to 26/40 on her fifth outing, in the Salsa. She returned to form the following week with a Waltz, scoring 36/40, and was joint first on the leaderboard. 

She was voted off the competition on 16 November 2008 (week nine), losing by three votes to one in the dance-off against model Lisa Snowdon after performing a Cha-Cha-Cha. In the January/February 2009 Strictly Tour, she danced an American Smooth and a rumba with James Jordan.

Personal life
Lunghi was briefly married to South African student Ralph Lawson after the pair met while studying at London's Central School of Speech and Drama. The 1975 marriage was one of convenience so that Lawson could remain in the UK. The couple never lived together as husband and wife, instead staying in separate homes in Newcastle. Lawson moved back to South Africa two years later to take a new job. She has a daughter, Nathalie Lunghi (b. 1986), with the director Roland Joffé.

Filmography

Television

Selected stage credits

References

External links

Cherie Lunghi fansite
Strictly Come Dancing Cherie Lunghi profile at bbc.co.uk

1952 births
Living people
Alumni of Homerton College, Cambridge
Alumni of the Royal Central School of Speech and Drama
English film actresses
English people of Italian descent
English stage actresses
English television actresses
People educated at the Arts Educational Schools
Royal Shakespeare Company members
Actresses from Nottinghamshire
English Shakespearean actresses
Actors from Nottingham
20th-century English actresses
21st-century English actresses
English radio actresses